LAM - Mozambique Airlines, S. A. (LAM  - Linhas Aéreas de Moçambique, S. A.) or Linhas Aéreas de Moçambique, Ltd., operating as LAM Mozambique Airlines, is the flag carrier of Mozambique. LAM Mozambique Airlines is based in Maputo, and has its hub at Maputo International Airport. It operates scheduled services in Southern Africa. The company is a member of the International Air Transport Association, and of the African Airlines Association since 1976.

History

Early years 
Charter flights were operated for a short period of time; a regular airmail service commenced on 22 December 1937 using a Dragonfly, a Hornet and two Rapides. Shortly afterwards, these services started carrying passengers, most of them government officials. Flown with Rapides, the Lourenço Marques–Germinston route was one of the company’s mainstays in the early years; it was operated on a twice-weekly basis, and connected with Imperial Airways services to London. In , the eight-hour-long domestic Lourenço Marques–Inhambane–Beira–Quelimane coastal route was opened. DETA passengers that were flown along the Mozambican coast could also connect with Imperial services at Lourenço Marques. At that time, Imperial Airways ran a service between Cape Town and Cairo that called at Lourenço Marques. Early in 1938, DETA had signed a contract with Imperial for the provision of such feeder services. During the spring, another Hornet was incorporated into the fleet. Also in 1938, the airline acquired three Junkers Ju 52s and two more Rapides. At , one Drangonfly, one Hornet, three Junkers Ju 52s and six Rapides were part of the fleet. Most of the operations came to a halt following the outbreak of World War II.

A new Moçambique–Nampula–Vila Cabral run that called at three more intermediate stops was opened in 1954. The last leg of this service was temporarily suspended when Vila Cabral was excluded from the airline's list of destinations, but flights to the city were later reinstated after Vila Cabral got linked with Beira via Vila Pery, Tete and Vila Coutinho. At , the carrier's fleet included three DC-3s, six Doves, one Dragon Fly, four Dragon Rapides, two Junkers Ju 52/3s, one Lockheed 14H, two Lodestars and two Horner Moths.

The airline was one of the last worldwide to operate the Junkers Ju 52s on scheduled services. DETA and Air Malawi inaugurated the Beira–Blantyre service in 1964; it was operated in a pool agreement between the two carriers. In 1965, Nova Freizo was added to the route network; in  that year, a service linking Beira with Lourenço Marques was launched. In , DETA and Swazi Air commenced flying the Lourenço Marques–Manzini run on a joint basis. Two Boeing 737-200s were ordered in 1968 both to complement the three F27s, six DC-3s, one Dove, and one Beaver already in the fleet, and to support the company's regional expansion, that had grown up to five destinations regionally served with the addition of Blantyre and Manzini to the network. The first of these machines entered the fleet in 1969. The airline would order two more Boeing 737-200s in the forthcoming years, taking possession of the fourth one in 1973.

Mozambique gained its independence from Portugal in 1975. Intercontinental services started in 1976 serving the Lourenço Marques–Beira–Accra–Lisbon route, at first with a Boeing 707-320, and then with a Boeing 707-320C leased from Tempair International Airlines. In 1979, a Douglas DC-8 was ordered.

Renaming 
DETA was Mozambique's flag carrier until 1980. Following allegations of corruption, the airline was restructured and renamed LAMLinhas Aéreas de Moçambique early that year. Four more Boeing 737-200s were ordered in 1981. The Douglas DC-8-62 that had been ordered at the end of the DETA era arrived in 1982. In 1983, a Douglas DC-10-30 was ordered. Also in 1983, a Maputo–Manzini–Maseru service that was flown using Fokker F27 aircraft was launched in cooperation with Lesotho Airways. The DC-10-30 joined the fleet in 1984, and new services to East Berlin, Copenhagen and Paris were started. At , the carrier had 1,927 employees. At this time, the DC-10-30 and three Boeing 737-200s (including a convertible one) worked on a route network radiating from Maputo that served Beira, Berlin-Schonefeld, Dar-es-Salaam, Harare, Johannesburg, Lisbon, Lusaka, Manzini, Maseru, Nampula, Paris, Pemba, Sofia and Quelimane. TACV Cabo Verde Airlines leased the DC-10 in the weekends during 1985.

The first Boeing 737-300 entered the fleet in 1991. By  that year, employment was 1,948, and the fleet consisted of two Boeing 737-200s (including a convertible one), one Boeing 767-200ER (plus another one on order) and four CASA 212-200s. The company had returned the 737-300 to the lessor in 1995 because of its inability to afford the leasing costs of the aircraft, and a Boeing 767-200ER would follow the same fate late that year. On , LAM became a limited company and rebranded as LAMMozambique Airlines.

EU ban 
Like all airlines with an AOC issued in Mozambique, the carrier is banned from operating into the European Union. At that time, the company claimed the Mozambican Civil Aviation Institute was responsible for the actions taken by the European Commission against all Mozambican carriers, and argued that it was an airline with an excellent safety record. , Lisbon was served with Airbus A340 aircraft. , the list of airlines banned in the EU still included LAM.
In May 2017, the European Commission removed all airlines certified in Mozambique from their list of banned airlines after an audit confirmed that aviation safety had improved in the country.

Corporate affairs

Ownership and subsidiaries 
, the state holds 91% of the shares and the employees hold the balance.

Business trends 
The airline has been loss-making for many years. Full annual reports do not appear to have been published, although financial results are now being released. Otherwise, the main sources for trends are industry and press reports, as shown below (as at year ending 31 December):

Key people 
João Carlos Pó Jorge was appointed General Director of the company on 24 July 2018.

Destinations 

As of February 2021, LAM Mozambique Airlines serves nine domestic and three international African routes mainly from its home base at Maputo International Airport.

Codeshare agreements 
LAM Mozambique Airlines has codeshare agreements with the following airlines:
Ethiopian Airlines
fastjet
Kenya Airways
South African Airways
TAAG Angola Airlines
TAP Air Portugal

Fleet

Current fleet 
The LAMMozambique Airlines fleet consists of the following aircraft (as of August 2019):

Fleet development 
The carrier received the second aircraft of the type a month later. Three Embraer 190s were in operation until , when one of them crashed in Namibia. In early , a Boeing 737 was leased to fill the capacity shortage created by the crashed airframe.

Historical fleet 
The airline previously operated the following aircraft:

Antonov An-26
Beech King Air 200
Boeing 707-320
Boeing 707-320C
Boeing 707-420
Boeing 737-100
Boeing 737-200
Boeing 737-200C
Boeing 737-300
 1 Boeing 737-500 (as of August 2017)
Boeing 747SP
Boeing 767-200ER
Boeing 767-300ER
Casa C-212-200 Aviocar
Douglas C-47A
Douglas C-47B
Douglas C-53
Fairchild Dornier Metro III
Fokker 100
Fokker F27-200
Fokker F27-600
Ilyushin Il-62MK
Jetstream 41
Indonesian Aerospace 212-200
Lockheed L-1011-500
Lockheed L-188AF
McDonnell Douglas DC-10-30
Partenavia P.68
Raytheon Beechcraft 1900C

Accidents and incidents 
, Aviation Safety Network records seven hull-loss events for the airline. Three of these events occurred in the DETA era, while the other four correspond to LAM. As of November 2013 there has been one fatal accident for LAM proper. Following is a list of these events.

See also 
 Airlines of Africa
 Transport in Mozambique

Notes

References

Bibliography

External links 

Airlines of Mozambique
Airlines established in 1936
Airlines formerly banned in the European Union
Government-owned airlines
Companies based in Maputo
1936 establishments in Mozambique